Paradyż may refer to the following places in Poland:
Paradyż, Opoczno County in Łódź Voivodeship (central Poland)
Paradyż, Pomeranian Voivodeship (north Poland)
Paradyż, former name of Gościkowo in Lubusz Voivodeship (west Poland)